Gangapuram is a neighbourhood in the city of Erode, Tamil Nadu. Located off the National Highway NH 544, it functioned as a village panchayat until 2011 when it was incorporated into Erode Municipal Corporation.

Economy
Agriculture is the major occupation of the people in the village. TexValley, a textile mall of Erode is located here. In recent years, there have been a lot of declining factories, auto looms and warehouses which were established in the village.

Demographics
Gangapuram Village Panchayat had a population of about 4,337 among which Males contribute about 2,230 and Females contributes 2,107.

References

External link 
 Geohack

Neighbourhoods in Erode